Path length can refer to:

Physics
 Distance, the total distance an object travels dependent on its path through space
 Optical path length, the product of the distance light travels and the refractive index of the medium it travels through
 Mean free path, the average distance that a particle travels before scattering
 Radiation length, a characteristic length for the decay of radiation in a medium

Networks and computing
 Average path length, the average number of steps along the shortest paths for all possible pairs of network nodes
 Hop count, the number of intermediate network devices through which data must pass between source and destination in a computer network
 Instruction path length, the number of machine code instructions required to execute a section of a computer program